Sulkowo-Bariany  is a village in the administrative district of Gmina Mochowo, within Sierpc County, Masovian Voivodeship, in east-central Poland.

The village has a population of 45.

References

Sulkowo-Bariany